KOKS (89.5 FM) is a Christian radio station licensed to Poplar Bluff, Missouri.  The station is owned by Calvary Educational Broadcasting Network.

KOKS's programming includes Christian Music and Christian Talk and Teaching programs. Christian Talk and Teaching shows heard on KOKS include; Thru the Bible with J. Vernon McGee, Focus On The Family, and Enjoying Everyday Life with Joyce Meyer.

References

External links
KOKS's official website

OKS
Radio stations established in 1988
1988 establishments in Missouri